Stephen Cutts (born 1964 in Bromley, England) has served in a number of leadership roles in Intergovernmental and not for profit organisations. He has a First Class Honours degree in American Studies and English Literature from the University of Keele, a PGCE from Lancaster University, an Executive MBA from INSEAD and an Honorary Doctorate from Keele University.

Career 
In 2008, Cutts joined the Commonwealth Secretariat in London. He served first as Director of Strategic Planning and Evaluation at the Commonwealth Secretariat, and then as Commonwealth Assistant Secretary-General for Corporate Affairs. In this position, he was in charge of the administration, finance, strategic planning and human resources matters. 

In 2013, Cutts joined the United Nations as Assistant Secretary-General for  the Office of Central Support Services in the Department of Management. He was appointed to this position by United Nations Secretary-General Ban Ki-moon on 3 April 2013.

References

British officials of the United Nations
Living people
Alumni of Keele University
Year of birth missing (living people)